Tazeh Kand District is in Parsabad County, Ardabil province, Iran. At the 2006 census, its population was 14,235 in 2,929 households. The following census in 2011 counted 14,204 people in 3,545 households. At the latest census in 2016, the district had 13,006 inhabitants living in 3,684 households.

References 

Parsabad County

Districts of Ardabil Province

Populated places in Ardabil Province

Populated places in Parsabad County